Skeneopsis is a genus of gastropods belonging to the family Skeneopsidae.

The species of this genus are found in Europe and Northern America.

Species:
Skeneopsis planorbis 
Skeneopsis sultanarum

References

Gastropods